Barbara Tucker (born 1967) is an American singer-songwriter.

Barbara Tucker may also refer to:

Barbara Grace Tucker, Australian born peace activist
Barbara Johnson Tucker (born 1944), American Christian music recording artist